Guettarda comata is a species of plant in the family Rubiaceae. The type was collected in Department of Loreto, Peru. This species occurs also in Colombia (Quindío, Risararda).

References

comata
Flora of Peru
Flora of Colombia
Vulnerable plants
Taxonomy articles created by Polbot